Feroleto may refer to a pair of Italian municipalities located in Calabria:

Feroleto Antico, in the Province of Catanzaro 
Feroleto della Chiesa, in the Province of Reggio Calabria